The Secretary of Health of Puerto Rico leads the Department of Health of Puerto Rico and all efforts related to health in Puerto Rico.

Secretaries

 1977–1984: Jaime Rivera Dueño
 1985–1988: Luis Izquierdo Mora
 1989: Enrique Méndez Grau 
 1990–1992: José Soler Zapata
 1993: Enrique Vazquez Quintana 
 1993–2000: Carmen Feliciano
 2001–2004: Johny Rullán
 2005–2007: Rosa Pérez Perdomo
 2008: Johnny Rullán 
 2009: Jaime Rivera Dueño 
 2009: Iván González Cancel 
 2009–2013: Lorenzo González Feliciano
 2013–2013: Francisco Joglar Pesquera
 2013–2016: Ana Ríus Armendáriz 
 2017–2020: Rafael Rodríguez Mercado 
 2020–2020: Concepción Quiñones de Longo (interim)
 2020–2021: Lorenzo González Feliciano
 2021 - Present: Carlos Mellado López

References

External links
  

Department of Health of Puerto Rico
 
Council of Secretaries of Puerto Rico